JS Hamayuki (DD-126) was a Hatsuyuki-class destroyer of the Japanese Maritime Self-Defense Force.

Development and design 

Adopting Japan's first all-gas turbine engine (COGOG), equipped with well-balanced weapons such as helicopters, C4I systems, and various missiles, it is inferior to Western frigate at that time. It has been evaluated as a non-escort ship. Twelve ships were built as first-generation general-purpose escort vessels in the era of eight ships and eight aircraft, they supported the escort fleet for a long time, but now they are gradually retiring due to aging.

In addition, there are many changes to training ships, and up to three ships have been operated in the training fleet as Shimayuki-class training ships, but the decline has begun with the conversion of Hatakaze-class destroyers to training ships.

The core of the combat system is the OYQ-5 Tactical Data Processing System (TDPS), composed of one AN/UYK-20 computer and five OJ-194B workstations and capable of receiving data automatically from other ships via Link-14 (STANAG 5514).

This is the first destroyer class in the JMSDF equipped with the Sea Sparrow Improved basic point defense missile system. The IBPDMS of this class uses FCS-2 fire-control systems of Japanese make and one octuple launcher at the afterdeck. And in the JMSDF, OTO Melara 76 mm compact gun and Boeing Harpoon surface-to-surface missile are adopted from the ship of FY1977 including this class. Also, ships built in FY1979 and beyond carried Phalanx CIWS and were retrofitted to previous ships.

Construction and career 
She was laid down on 4 February 1981 and launched on 27 May 1982 at Mitsui Engineering & Shipbuilding Shipyard in Tamano. She commissioned on 18 November 1983.

In 1986, she participated in Exercise RIMPAC 1986.

On March 6, 1990, the 42nd Escort Corps was reorganized under the 3rd Escort Corps group, and the homeport was transferred to Maizuru. In the same year, she participated in Exercise RIMPAC 1990.

In March 2013, she underwent ship remodeling by Japan Marine United Maizuru. From the bow side to the stern, numbers 1 to 13 divided every 10 m and white and orange paint were applied, and drums for targets and heat sources were installed on the ship. On October 5, 2013, she left the Kitasui quay for shooting disposition by live-fire training. The training was held in the waters north of Wakasa Bay from the 6th to the 11th, and was the target of shooting by five escort vessels and two patrol aircraft which dropped bombs on her.

Gallery

References

1982 ships
Ships built by Mitsui Engineering and Shipbuilding
Hatsuyuki-class destroyers